Zongshen is a Chinese manufacturing company producing motorcycles, quad bikes, generators and engines, based in Chongqing, China. It claims to have a yearly output of over 1,000,000 motorcycles.

Zongshen Chongqing is the original manufacturer of the Zongshen 200 GS and Zongshen 250 GS.

History 
Zuo Zongshen, who had grown up in poverty, founded the Zongshen company in 1992.

In 2006, founder Zuo Zongshen was profiled in the Discovery Channel and CBC co-produced documentary China Rises as a member of China's nouveau riche.

In 2007, Zongshen invested CNY300 million into a new research and development center in Chongqing, as part of their "Cyclone" program. The program is designed to produce unique technology and designs for Zongshen's new models, and differentiate the brand from a competitive environment of almost identical models.

In 2012, Zongshen exported roughly 30% of its motorcycle production. It re-brands its products in many countries and its products can be seen in the lines of many retailers and distributors in the United Kingdom, Italy, Spain, Portugal, Belarus, Russia, Argentina, Colombia, and Brazil.

Activities 
Today, the Zongshen Group consists of 52 wholly owned or part-owned subsidiary companies.
The Zongshen group has over 18,000 employees, and the total assets or worth over 4 billion yuan. It claims to be one of the five largest motorcycle manufacturers in China. They entered into partnerships with Harley Davidson and Piaggio.

Zongshen Group also owns Zongshen PEM, a Canadian subsidiary registered in Vancouver that sells motorcycles, e-bikes, and electric scooters to the North American market.

Models 
Zongshen models include: 
 ZS 50 GY 
 ZS 110-26 
 ZS 125-2 
 ZS 125-4
 ZS 125 GY-A 
 ZS 125 ST ATV 
 ZS 125 T-7 
 ZS 125 T-8 
 ZS 150 GY 
 ZS 200 GY 
 ZS 250 GY-3
 ZS 125 T-30 
 ZS 200 GS 
 ZS 250 GS 
 ZS 250-5
 Zongshen 250cm-3 zs171fmm atv
 ZS 250GY-3

KD50QT-4

Zongshen/Kangda Pexma KD50QT-4 is a four-stroke, single-cylinder city-scooter, with an engine displacement of 50 cc.

Specifications

Engine type: four-stroke, one-cylinder, air-cooled, OHC, two valves.
Displacement: 49,7 cc
Horsepower: 3,4 Bhp (2,5 kW)
Fuel economy: 54 km/l

Zongshen ZS 150 GY
Zongshen/ZS 150 GY is a four-stroke, single-cylinder street legal supermoto, with an engine displacement of 150 cc.

Zongshen Racing

Zongshen races in various motorcycle championships as China Zongshen Racing. It is a major competitor in the China Superbike Championship, winning the riders' titles in 2007 and 2008.
In 2002, Zongshen team of China took the 2 first place of the world endurance championship with the French coach; "Michel MARQUETON"
In 2003, The Zongshen team took the 5 first races of the world endurance championship with the same coach but finished the championship in 2nd place 

Zongshen have also won several FIM E-motorcycle championships (also known as the TTXGP) in recent years, competing against well-funded teams from around the world. While many of the critical parts of Zongshen's electric motorcycle are not strictly produced by Zongshen, they maintain that they developed the motorcycle in-house. The racing e-motorcycle that Zongshen used to win the 2013 TTXGP is powered by a Yasa-750 electric motor.
In 2017 Zongshen engaged 5 motorcycles in the Dakar Rally 2017 with 2 French pilots, Willy Jobard and Thierry Bethys with the new engine NC 450

Zongshen Small Engines
Zongshen manufactures small engines used commonly on garden machinery, power generators and motorcycles.

References

External links
Zongshen main site
 https://www.youtube.com/watch?v=2kCcTdsza6A

Motorcycle manufacturers of China
 
Vehicle manufacturing companies established in 1992
Manufacturing companies based in Chongqing
Chinese brands